HMS P611 was a submarine of the  originally built for the Turkish Navy intended to be named Oruç Reis, but commissioned into the Royal Navy after the outbreak of war.

TCG Oruç Reis

She was a modified British S class design launched on 19 July 1940 by Vickers Armstrong at Barrow. Due to the pressing need for her, she was commissioned into the Royal Navy on 1 December 1941 so she could be sent to Turkey. It was not until 26 March 1942 that she left the Clyde for Gibraltar. On 7 April she left Gibraltar for Alexandria, where she arrived on 25 April. She arrived at the Turkish naval base at İskenderun on 9 May 1942 and was handed over to the Turkish Navy as Oruç Reis. She would continue in service with the Turkish Navy, operating in the Mediterranean, and remained in service after the war ended. She was finally broken up in 1957.

References

Submarines, War Beneath The Waves, From 1776 To The Present Day, by Robert Hutchinson

 

Oruç Reis-class submarines
Ships built in Barrow-in-Furness
1940 ships
World War II submarines of the United Kingdom
World War II submarines of Turkey